Final league standings for the 1911-12 St. Louis Soccer League.

League standings

External links
St. Louis Soccer Leagues (RSSSF)
The Year in American Soccer - 1912

1911-12
1911–12 domestic association football leagues
1911–12 in American soccer
St Louis Soccer
St Louis Soccer